Scotinoecus is a genus of South American funnel-web spiders that was first described by Eugène Louis Simon in 1892. Originally placed with the curtain web spiders, it was moved to the Hexathelidae in 1980.

Species
 it contains four species:
Scotinoecus cinereopilosus (Simon, 1889) (type) – Chile
Scotinoecus fasciatus Tullgren, 1901 – Chile, Argentina
Scotinoecus major Ríos-Tamayo & Goloboff, 2012 – Chile
Scotinoecus ruiles Ríos-Tamayo & Goloboff, 2012 – Chile

References

Hexathelidae
Mygalomorphae genera
Spiders of South America